The Unity Party (officially, the South Ossetian Republican Political Party "Unity") was a major political party with a socially conservative ideology in South Ossetia during the 2000s. South Ossetia is a partially recognized Caucasian republic, considered by most countries to be a part of Georgia. The Unity Party, founded in 2003, supported former President Eduard Kokoity, and was for a decade the largest political party in South Ossetia. After the 2009 elections, the party held 17 out of 34 seats in South Ossetia's parliament. It is modeled after and is closely linked to the United Russia party, with which it has signed an inter-party cooperation agreement. The party is a winner of the 2004 and 2009 parliamentary elections.

It is currently led by Zurab Kokoyev.

Election results

Parliament

See also
 United Russia
 United Ossetia

References

Political parties established in 2003
Political parties in South Ossetia
Conservative parties
Social conservative parties